Patrick Mocci-Raoumbe (born 16 January 1970) is a former Gabonese sprinter who competed in the men's 100m competition at the 1996 Summer Olympics. He recorded a 10.87, not enough to qualify for the next round past the heats. His personal best is 10.50, set in 1996. He also ran for Gabon's 4 × 100 m relay team, which finished 5th in its heat with a time of 39.97.

References

1970 births
Living people
Gabonese male sprinters
Athletes (track and field) at the 1996 Summer Olympics
Olympic athletes of Gabon
21st-century Gabonese people